The 1980 Auckland City mayoral election was part of the New Zealand local elections held that same year. In 1980, elections were held for the Mayor of Auckland plus other local government positions including twenty-one city councillors. The polling was conducted using the standard first-past-the-post electoral method.

Background
Long serving Mayor Dove-Myer Robinson reneged on his 1977 promise to retire in 1980 and stood for re-election. He was defeated by former Citizens & Ratepayers councillor Colin Kay, who stood as an independent.

Mayoralty results

Councillor results

References

Mayoral elections in Auckland
1980 elections in New Zealand
Politics of the Auckland Region
1980s in Auckland
October 1980 events in New Zealand